Asa Kryst (born May 25, 1993 in Jackson, Michigan) is an American professional soccer player.

Personal life
Kryst is the younger brother of American television presenter and beauty pageant titleholder Cheslie Kryst, who was crowned Miss USA 2019 and passed away on January 30, 2022 from apparent suicide.

Career

College and amateur
Kryst played college soccer at the University of South Carolina from 2011 to 2015, including a red-shirted year in 2014.

While at college, Kryst also appeared for USL PDL clubs IMG Academy Bradenton and SC United Bantams.

Professional
Kryst signed with United Soccer League side Charlotte Independence on April 27, 2016.

Kryst signed with Australian National Premiere League side Bendigo City FC on May 20, 2017.

References

1993 births
Living people
American soccer players
South Carolina Gamecocks men's soccer players
IMG Academy Bradenton players
SC United Bantams players
Charlotte Independence players
Soccer players from South Carolina
USL League Two players
USL Championship players
Association football forwards
American people of Polish descent